indigo la End is a Japanese rock band led by vocalist and songwriter Enon Kawatani. The band released their debut extended play in 2012 with independent label Space Shower Records, and were later signed by Warner sub-label Unborde.

Biography 
The band first began in April 2009, however after a member change began full activities from February 2010. The original bassist, E ni Naranai Kachō, left the band in July 2011. In January he was replaced with Mariko Wada, and the band released their debut extended play Sayōnara, Subarashii Sekai in April 2012. Mariko Wada left soon after in June, with the band releasing a second extended play Nagisa nite in September.

The band released their debut album Yoru ni Mahō o Kakerarete in February 2013. Two months later saw the debut of another band of vocalist Enon Kawatani's, Gesu no Kiwami Otome, when they released the extended play Dress no Nugikata. Gesu no Kiwami Otome featured former indigo la End bassist E ni Naranai Kachō. In December, the band was signed to Warner sub-label Unborde simultaneously with Gesu no Kiwami Otome. Both musical units released their major label debut released on April 2, 2014: Minna Normal for Gesu no Kiwami Otome and Ano Machi Record for Indigo la End.

In the remainder of 2014, the band released two singles, Hitomi ni Utsuranai and Sayonara Bell the end of the band's performance at the Countdown Japan 14/15 new years music festival, band drummer Yūsuke Ōta announced his retirement from the band, citing differences in opinion for the future of the band. His final recordings with the band are featured on their second studio album, Shiawase ga Afuretara (2015).

Later in 2015, the band released the singles Kanashiku Naru Mae Ni and the double A-Side single Shizuku ni Koi Shite/Wasurete Hanataba, which was followed by another single in 2016, Kokoro Ame. In July 2016, the band released their third studio album, and second major label album, Aiiro Music (2016).

In 2017, the band's song Kane Naku Inochi was featured as the opening theme song of the Japanese television drama Inside Mari, and was released as part of the band's third major label album, and fourth studio album, Crying End Roll (2017). That same year, band leader Kawatani Enon's birthday on December 3 served as the release date for the band's first digital single, Touya no Magic. This was followed in April 2018 by a second digital single, Haru no Iutōri, and the release of their fifth studio and fourth major label album, PULSATE (2018), in July 2018.

Their fifth full major label album, Nureyuku Shishousetsu (2019), was released on October 9, 2019.

The band's name was inspired by Japanese band Spitz and their album Indigo Chiheisen (1996).

Members 
, real name , is the band's vocalist, guitarist and main songwriter, who also fronts the band Gesu no Kiwami Otome.
, real name , is the band's guitarist.
 is the band's bassist. Formerly a support member, he was promoted to being a fully-fledged member on August 10, 2014.
 is the band's drummer. Formerly a support member for the band's 2015 Shiawase ga Afuretara tour, he was promoted to being a fully-fledged member on March 17, 2015.

Former members 
, real name , was the band's drummer. In December 2014 he left the band, after recording the Shiawase ga Afuretara album and performing at the Countdown Japan 14/15 festival.
, real name , was the band's bassist from 2010 until July 2011. From 2007 to 2009, Wada was a member of the band Aomune, performing under the name .
 was the band's bassist from January 2012, but announced her retirement in June 2012. During her time with the band, she also worked as a member of the bands Boots on Avalanche and Far France, and was formerly a member of Halt.

Discography

Studio albums

Extended plays

Singles

As lead artists

As featured artists

Promotional singles

Notes

References

External links 

 
 Official Warner Label Site

2010 establishments in Japan
Japanese alternative rock groups
Japanese indie rock groups
Musical groups established in 2010
Musical groups from Tokyo
Musical quartets
Warner Music Japan artists